Richard McKay Rorty (October 4, 1931 – June 8, 2007) was an American philosopher. Educated at the University of Chicago and Yale University, he had strong interests and training in both the history of philosophy and in contemporary analytic philosophy. Rorty had a long and diverse academic career, including positions as Stuart Professor of Philosophy at Princeton University, Kenan Professor of Humanities at the University of Virginia, and Professor of Comparative literature at Stanford University. Among his most influential books are Philosophy and the Mirror of Nature (1979), Consequences of Pragmatism (1982), and Contingency, Irony, and Solidarity (1989).

Rorty rejected the long held idea that correct internal representations of objects in the outside world is a necessary prerequisite for knowledge. Rorty argued instead that knowledge is an internal and linguistic affair; knowledge only relates to our own language. Rorty argues that language is made up of vocabularies that are temporary and historical, and concludes that "[...] since vocabularies are made by human beings, so are truths." The acceptance of the preceding arguments leads to what Rorty calls "ironism"; a state of mind where people are completely aware that their knowledge is dependent on their time and place in history, and are therefore somewhat detached from their own beliefs. However, Rorty also argues that "[...] a belief can still regulate action, can still be thought worth dying for, among people who are quite aware that this belief is caused by nothing deeper than contingent historical circumstance."

Biography
Richard Rorty was born on October 4, 1931, in New York City. His parents, James and Winifred Rorty, were activists, writers and social democrats. His maternal grandfather, Walter Rauschenbusch, was a central figure in the Social Gospel movement of the early 20th century.

His father experienced two nervous breakdowns in his later life. The second breakdown, which he had in the early 1960s, was more serious and "included claims to divine prescience." Consequently, Richard Rorty fell into depression as a teenager and in 1962 began a six-year psychiatric analysis for obsessional neurosis. Rorty wrote about the beauty of rural New Jersey orchids in his short autobiography, "Trotsky and the Wild Orchids," and his desire to combine aesthetic beauty and social justice. His colleague Jürgen Habermas's obituary for Rorty points out that Rorty's childhood experiences led him to a vision of philosophy as the reconciliation of "the celestial beauty of orchids with Trotsky's dream of justice on earth." Habermas describes Rorty as an ironist:

Nothing is sacred to Rorty the ironist. Asked at the end of his life about the 'holy', the strict atheist answered with words reminiscent of the young Hegel: 'My sense of the holy is bound up with the hope that some day my remote descendants will live in a global civilization in which love is pretty much the only law.'

Rorty enrolled at the University of Chicago shortly before turning 15, where he received a bachelor's and a master's degree in philosophy (studying under Richard McKeon), continuing at Yale University for a PhD in philosophy (1952–1956). He married another academic, Amélie Oksenberg (Harvard University professor), with whom he had a son, Jay Rorty, in 1954. After two years in the United States Army, he taught at Wellesley College for three years until 1961. Rorty divorced his wife and then married Stanford University bioethicist Mary Varney in 1972. They had two children, Kevin and Patricia, now Max. While Richard Rorty was a "strict atheist" (Habermas), Mary Varney Rorty was a practicing Mormon.

Rorty was a professor of philosophy at Princeton University for 21 years. In 1981, he was a recipient of a MacArthur Fellowship, commonly known as the "Genius Award", in its first year of awarding, and in 1982 he became Kenan Professor of the Humanities at the University of Virginia, working closely with colleagues and students in multiple departments, especially in English. In 1998 Rorty became professor of comparative literature (and philosophy, by courtesy), at Stanford University, where he spent the remainder of his academic career. During this period he was especially popular, and once quipped that he had been assigned to the position of "transitory professor of trendy studies."

Rorty's doctoral dissertation, The Concept of Potentiality was a historical study of the concept, completed under the supervision of Paul Weiss, but his first book (as editor), The Linguistic Turn (1967), was firmly in the prevailing analytic mode, collecting classic essays on the linguistic turn in analytic philosophy. However, he gradually became acquainted with the American philosophical movement known as pragmatism, particularly the writings of John Dewey. The noteworthy work being done by analytic philosophers such as Willard Van Orman Quine and Wilfrid Sellars caused significant shifts in his thinking, which were reflected in his next book, Philosophy and the Mirror of Nature (1979).

Pragmatists generally hold that the meaning of a proposition is determined by its use in linguistic practice. Rorty combined pragmatism about truth and other matters with a later Wittgensteinian philosophy of language which declares that meaning is a social-linguistic product, and sentences do not 'link up' with the world in a correspondence relation. Rorty wrote in his Contingency, Irony, and Solidarity (1989):

Truth cannot be out there—cannot exist independently of the human mind—because sentences cannot so exist, or be out there. The world is out there, but descriptions of the world are not. Only descriptions of the world can be true or false. The world on its own unaided by the describing activities of humans cannot."(5)

Views like this led Rorty to question many of philosophy's most basic assumptions—and have also led to him being apprehended as a postmodern/deconstructionist philosopher. Indeed, from the late 1980s through the 1990s, Rorty focused on the continental philosophical tradition, examining the works of Friederich Nietzsche, Martin Heidegger, Michel Foucault, Jean-François Lyotard and Jacques Derrida. His work from this period included: Contingency, Irony, and Solidarity (1989); Essays on Heidegger and Others: Philosophical Papers II (1991); and Truth and Progress: Philosophical Papers III (1998). The latter two works attempt to bridge the dichotomy between analytic and continental philosophy by claiming that the two traditions complement rather than oppose each other.

According to Rorty, analytic philosophy may not have lived up to its pretensions and may not have solved the puzzles it thought it had. Yet such philosophy, in the process of finding reasons for putting those pretensions and puzzles aside, helped earn itself an important place in the history of ideas. By giving up on the quest for apodicticity and finality that Edmund Husserl shared with Rudolf Carnap and Bertrand Russell, and by finding new reasons for thinking that such quest will never succeed, analytic philosophy cleared a path that leads past scientism, just as the German idealists cleared a path that led around empiricism.

In the last fifteen years of his life, Rorty continued to publish his writings, including Philosophy as Cultural Politics (Philosophical Papers IV), and Achieving Our Country (1998), a political manifesto partly based on readings of Dewey and Walt Whitman in which he defended the idea of a progressive, pragmatic left against what he feels are defeatist, anti-liberal, anti-humanist positions espoused by the critical left and continental school. Rorty felt these anti-humanist positions were personified by figures like Nietzsche, Heidegger, and Foucault. Such theorists were also guilty of an "inverted Platonism" in which they attempted to craft overarching, metaphysical, "sublime" philosophies—which in fact contradicted their core claims to be ironist and contingent. Rorty's last works, after his move to Stanford University concerned the place of religion in contemporary life, liberal communities, comparative literature and philosophy as "cultural politics".

Shortly before his death, he wrote a piece called "The Fire of Life", (published in the November 2007 issue of Poetry magazine), in which he meditates on his diagnosis and the comfort of poetry. He concludes, "I now wish that I had spent somewhat more of my life with verse. This is not because I fear having missed out on truths that are incapable of statement in prose. There are no such truths; there is nothing about death that Swinburne and Landor knew but Epicurus and Heidegger failed to grasp. Rather, it is because I would have lived more fully if I had been able to rattle off more old chestnuts—just as I would have if I had made more close friends. Cultures with richer vocabularies are more fully human—farther removed from the beasts—than those with poorer ones; individual men and women are more fully human when their memories are amply stocked with verses."

On June 8, 2007, Rorty died in his home from pancreatic cancer.

Major works

Philosophy and the Mirror of Nature

In Philosophy and the Mirror of Nature (1979) Rorty argues that the central problems of modern epistemology depend upon a picture of the mind as trying to faithfully represent (or "mirror") a mind-independent, external reality. When we give up this metaphor, the entire enterprise of foundationalist epistemology simply dissolves.

An epistemological foundationalist believes that in order to avoid the regress inherent in claiming that all beliefs are justified by other beliefs, some beliefs must be self-justifying and form the foundations to all knowledge. Rorty however criticized both the idea that arguments can be based upon self-evident premises (within language) and the idea that arguments can be based upon noninferential sensations (outside language).

The first critique draws on Quine's work on sentences thought to be analytically true – that is, sentences thought to be true solely by virtue of what they mean and independently of fact. Quine  argues that the problem with analytically true sentences is the attempt to convert identity-based but empty analytical truths like "no unmarried man is married" to synonymity-based analytical truths like "no bachelor is married". When trying to do so, one must first prove that "unmarried man" and "bachelor" means exactly the same, and that is not possible without considering facts – that is, looking towards the domain of synthetic truths. When doing so, one will notice that the two concepts actually differ; "bachelor" sometimes mean "bachelor of arts" for instance. Quine therefore argues that a boundary between analytic and synthetic statements simply has not been drawn, and concludes that this boundary or distinction [...] is an unempirical dogma of empiricists, a metaphysical article of faith.

The second critique draws on Sellars's work on the empiricist idea that there is a non-linguistic but epistemologically relevant "given" available in sensory perception. Sellars argue that only language can work as a foundation for arguments; non-linguistic sensory perceptions are incompatible with language and are therefore irrelevant. In Sellars' view, the claim that there is an epistemologically relevant "given" in sensory perception is a myth; a fact is not something that is given to us, it is something that we as language-users actively take. Only after we have learned a language is it possible for us to construe as "empirical data" the particulars and arrays of particulars we have come to be able to observe.

Each critique, taken alone, provides a problem for a conception of how philosophy ought to proceed, yet leaves enough of the tradition intact to proceed with its former aspirations. Combined, Rorty claimed, the two critiques are devastating. With no privileged realm of truth or meaning that can work as a self-evident foundation for our arguments, we have, instead, only truth defined as beliefs that pay their way, in other words beliefs that are useful to us somehow. The only worthwhile description of the actual process of inquiry, Rorty claimed, was a Kuhnian account of the standard phases of the progress of disciplines, oscillating through normal and abnormal periods, between routine problem-solving and intellectual crises.

After rejecting foundationalism, Rorty argues that one of the few roles left for a philosopher is to act as an intellectual gadfly, attempting to induce a revolutionary break with previous practice, a role that Rorty was happy to take on himself. Rorty suggests that each generation tries to subject all disciplines to the model that the most successful discipline of the day employs. In Rorty's view, the success of modern science has led academics in philosophy and the humanities to mistakenly imitate scientific methods.

Contingency, Irony, and Solidarity

In Contingency, Irony, and Solidarity (1989), Rorty argues that there is no worthwhile theory of truth, aside from the non-epistemic semantic theory Donald Davidson developed (based on the work of Alfred Tarski). Rorty also suggests that there are two kinds of philosophers; philosophers occupied with private or public matters. Private philosophers, who provide one with greater abilities to (re)create oneself (a view adapted from Nietzsche and which Rorty also identifies with the novels of Marcel Proust and Vladimir Nabokov) should not be expected to help with public problems. For a public philosophy, one might instead turn to philosophers like Rawls or Habermas.

This book also marks his first attempt to specifically articulate a political vision consistent with his philosophy, the vision of a diverse community bound together by opposition to cruelty, and not by abstract ideas such as 'justice' or 'common humanity.' Consistent with his anti-foundationalism, Rorty states that there is "[...] no noncircular theoretical backup for the belief that cruelty is horrible."

Rorty also introduces the terminology of ironism, which he uses to describe his mindset and his philosophy. Rorty describes the ironist as a person who "[...] worries that the process of socialization which turned her into a human being by giving her a language may have given her the wrong language, and so turned her into the wrong kind of human being. But she cannot give a criterion of wrongness."

Objectivity, Relativism, and Truth
Amongst the essays in Objectivity, Relativism, and Truth: Philosophical Papers, Volume 1 (1990), is "The Priority of Democracy to Philosophy," in which Rorty defends Rawls against communitarian critics. Rorty argues that liberalism can "get along without philosophical presuppositions," while at the same time conceding to communitarians that "a conception of the self that makes the community constitutive of the self does comport well with liberal democracy."  For Rorty, social institutions ought to be thought of as "experiments in cooperation rather than as attempts to embody a universal and ahistorical order."

Essays on Heidegger and Others
In this text, Rorty focuses primarily on the continental philosophers Martin Heidegger and Jacques Derrida. He argues that these European "post-Nietzscheans" share much with American pragmatists, in that they critique metaphysics and reject the correspondence theory of truth. When discussing Derrida, Rorty claims that Derrida is most useful when viewed as a funny writer who attempted to circumvent the Western philosophical tradition, rather than the inventor of a philosophical (or literary) "method". In this vein, Rorty criticizes Derrida's followers like Paul de Man for taking deconstructive literary theory too seriously.

Achieving Our Country

In Achieving Our Country: Leftist Thought in Twentieth-Century America (1997), Rorty differentiates between what he sees as the two sides of the Left, a cultural Left and a progressive Left. He criticizes the cultural Left, which is exemplified by post-structuralists such as Foucault and postmodernists such as Lyotard, for offering critiques of society, but no alternatives (or alternatives that are so vague and general as to be abdications). Although these intellectuals make insightful claims about the ills of society, Rorty suggests that they provide no alternatives and even occasionally deny the possibility of progress. On the other hand, the progressive Left, exemplified for Rorty by the pragmatist Dewey, Whitman and James Baldwin, makes hope for a better future its priority. Without hope, Rorty argues, change is spiritually inconceivable and the cultural Left has begun to breed cynicism. Rorty sees the progressive Left as acting in the philosophical spirit of pragmatism.

On human rights
Rorty's notion of human rights is grounded on the notion of sentimentality. He contended that throughout history humans have devised various means of construing certain groups of individuals as inhuman or subhuman. Thinking in rationalist (foundationalist) terms will not solve this problem, he claimed. Rorty advocated the creation of a culture of global human rights in order to stop violations from happening through a sentimental education. He argued that we should create a sense of empathy or teach empathy to others so as to understand others' suffering.

On hope
Rorty advocates for what philosopher Nick Gall characterizes as a "boundless hope" or type of "melancholic meliorism." According to this view, Rorty replaces foundationalist hopes for certainty with those of perpetual growth and constant change, which he believes enables us to send conversation and hopes in new directions we currently can't imagine.

Rorty articulates this boundless hope in his 1982 book Consequences of Pragmatism, where he applies his framework of wholesale hope versus retail hope. Herein he says, "Let me sum up by offering a third and final characterization of pragmatism: It is the doctrine that there are no constraints on inquiry save conversational ones-no wholesale constraints derived from the nature of the objects, or of the mind, or of language, but only those retail constraints provided by the remarks of our fellow inquirers."

Reception and criticism
Rorty is among the most widely discussed and controversial contemporary philosophers, and his works have provoked thoughtful responses from many other well-respected figures in the field. In Robert Brandom's anthology Rorty and His Critics, for example, Rorty's philosophy is discussed by Donald Davidson, Jürgen Habermas, Hilary Putnam, John McDowell, Jacques Bouveresse, and Daniel Dennett, among others. In 2007, Roger Scruton wrote, "Rorty was paramount among those thinkers who advance their own opinion as immune to criticism, by pretending that it is not truth but consensus that counts, while defining the consensus in terms of people like themselves." Ralph Marvin Tumaob concludes that Rorty was really influenced by Jean-François Lyotard's metanarratives, and added that "postmodernism was influenced further by the works of Rorty".

McDowell is strongly influenced by Rorty, particularly Philosophy and the Mirror of Nature (1979). In continental philosophy, authors such as Jürgen Habermas, Gianni Vattimo, Jacques Derrida, Albrecht Wellmer, Hans Joas, Chantal Mouffe, Simon Critchley, Esa Saarinen, and Mike Sandbothe are influenced in different ways by Rorty's thinking. American novelist David Foster Wallace titled a short story in his collection Oblivion: Stories "Philosophy and the Mirror of Nature", and critics have identified Rorty's influence in some of Wallace's writings on irony.

Susan Haack has been a fierce critic of Rorty's neopragmatism. Haack criticises Rorty's claim to be a pragmatist at all and wrote a short play called We Pragmatists, where Rorty and Charles Sanders Peirce have a fictional conversation using only accurate quotes from their own writing. For Haack, the only link between Rorty's neopragmatism and Peirce's pragmatism is the name. Haack believes Rorty's neopragmatism is anti-philosophical and anti-intellectual, and exposes people further to rhetorical manipulation.

Although Rorty was an avowed liberal, his political and moral philosophies have been attacked by commentators from the Left, some of whom believe them to be insufficient frameworks for social justice. Rorty was also criticized for his rejection of the idea that science can depict the world. One criticism, especially of Contingency, Irony, and Solidarity, is that Rorty's philosophical hero, the ironist, is an elitist figure. Rorty argues that most people would be "commonsensically nominalist and historicist" but not ironist. They would combine an ongoing attention to the particular as opposed to the transcendent (nominalism) with an awareness of their place in a continuum of contingent lived experience alongside other individuals (historicist), without necessarily having continual doubts about the resulting worldview as the ironist does. An ironist is someone who "has radical and continuing doubts about their final vocabulary" “a set of words which they [humans] employ to justify their actions, their beliefs, and their lives” (Rorty 1989: 73); "realizes that argument phrased in their vocabulary can neither underwrite nor dissolve these doubts"; and "does not think their vocabulary is closer to reality than others" (all 73, Contingency, Irony, and Solidarity). On the other hand, the Italian philosopher Gianni Vattimo and the Spanish philosopher Santiago Zabala in their 2011 book Hermeneutic Communism: from Heidegger to Marx affirm that together with Richard Rorty we also consider it a flaw that "the main thing contemporary academic Marxists inherit from Marx and Engels is the conviction that the quest for the cooperative commonwealth should be scientific rather than utopian, knowing rather than romantic." As we will show hermeneutics contains all the utopian and romantic features that Rorty refers to because, contrary to the knowledge of science, it does not claim modern universality but rather postmodern particularism.

Rorty often draws on a broad range of other philosophers to support his views, and his interpretation of their work has been contested. Since he is working from a tradition of reinterpretation, he is not interested in "accurately" portraying other thinkers, but rather in using it in the same way a literary critic might use a novel. His essay "The Historiography of Philosophy: Four Genres" is a thorough description of how he treats the greats in the history of philosophy. In Contingency, Irony, and Solidarity, Rorty attempts to disarm those who criticize his writings by arguing that their philosophical criticisms are made using axioms that are explicitly rejected within Rorty's own philosophy. For instance, he defines allegations of irrationality as affirmations of vernacular "otherness", and so—Rorty argues—accusations of irrationality can be expected during any argument and must simply be brushed aside.

Awards and honors
1973: Guggenheim Fellowship
1981: MacArthur Fellowship
1983: Elected to the American Academy of Arts and Sciences
2005: Elected to the American Philosophical Society
2007: The Thomas Jefferson Medal, awarded by the American Philosophical Society

Select bibliography
As author
 Philosophy and the Mirror of Nature. Princeton: Princeton University Press, 1979.
 Consequences of Pragmatism. Minneapolis: University of Minnesota Press, 1982. 
 Contingency, Irony, and Solidarity. Cambridge: Cambridge University Press, 1989. 
 Philosophical Papers vols. I–IV:
 Objectivity, Relativism and Truth: Philosophical Papers I. Cambridge: Cambridge University Press, 1991. 
 Essays on Heidegger and Others: Philosophical Papers II. Cambridge: Cambridge University Press, 1991.
 Truth and Progress: Philosophical Papers III. Cambridge: Cambridge University Press, 1998.
 Philosophy as Cultural Politics: Philosophical Papers IV. Cambridge: Cambridge University Press, 2007.
 Mind, Language, and Metaphilosophy: Early Philosophical Papers Eds. S. Leach and J. Tartaglia. Cambridge: Cambridge University Press, 2014. .
 Achieving Our Country: Leftist Thought in Twentieth Century America. Cambridge, MA: Harvard University Press, 1998. 
 Philosophy and Social Hope. New York: Penguin, 2000.
 Against Bosses, Against Oligarchies: A Conversation with Richard Rorty. Chicago: Prickly Paradigm Press, 2002.
 The Future of Religion with Gianni Vattimo Ed. Santiago Zabala. New York: Columbia University Press, 2005. 
 An Ethics for Today: Finding Common Ground Between Philosophy and Religion. New York: Columbia University Press, 2005. 
 What's the Use of Truth with Pascal Engel, transl. by William McCuaig, New York: Columbia University Press, 2007 
On Philosophy and Philosophers: Unpublished papers 1960-2000, Ed. by W. P. Małecki and Chris Vopa, CUPress 2020 
 Pragmatism as Anti-Authoritarianism, Ed. E. Mendieta, foreword by Robert B. Brandom, Harvard UP 2021, 

As editor
 The Linguistic Turn, Essays in Philosophical Method, (1967), ed. by Richard M. Rorty, University of Chicago press, 1992,  (an introduction and two retrospective essays)
 Philosophy in History. ed. by R. Rorty, J. B. Schneewind and Quentin Skinner, Cambridge: Cambridge University Press, 1985 (an essay by R. Rorty, "Historiography of philosophy", pp. 29–76)

See also

 Instrumentalism
 List of American philosophers
 List of liberal theorists
 List of thinkers influenced by deconstruction

Notes

Further reading
 Randall Auxier, Eli Kramer, Krzysztof Piotr Skowroński, eds.,  Rorty and Beyond, 2019
 Ulf Schulenberg, Romanticism and Pragmatism: Richard Rorty and the Idea of a Poeticized Culture, 2015
 Krzysztof Piotr Skowroński, Values, Valuations, and Axiological Norms in Richard Rorty's Neopragmatism, 2015
 Marianne Janack,   What We Mean By Experience, 2012
 Marianne Janack, editor, Feminist Interpretations of Richard Rorty, 2010
 James Tartaglia, Richard Rorty: Critical Assessments, 4 vols., 2009
 Neil Gross, Richard Rorty: The Making of an American Philosopher, 2008
Gross, Neil. 2019. Richard Rorty: the Making of an American Philosopher. University of Chicago Press.
 Rorty's Politics of Redescription / Gideon Calder, 2007
 Rorty and the Mirror of Nature / James Tartaglia, 2007
 Richard Rorty: Pragmatism and Political Liberalism / Michael Bacon, 2007
 Richard Rorty: politics and vision / Christopher Voparil, 2006
 Richard Rorty: his philosophy under discussion / Andreas Vieth, 2005
 Richard Rorty / Charles B Guignon., 2003
 Rorty / Gideon Calder, 2003
 Richard Rorty's American faith / Taub, Gad Shmuel, 2003
 The ethical ironist: Kierkegaard, Rorty, and the educational quest / Rohrer, Patricia Jean, 2003
 Doing philosophy as a way to individuation: Reading Rorty and Cavell / Kwak, Duck-Joo, 2003
 Richard Rorty / Alan R Malachowski, 2002
 Richard Rorty: critical dialogues / Matthew Festenstein, 2001
 Richard Rorty: education, philosophy, and politics / Michael Peters, 2001
 Rorty and his critics / Robert Brandom, 2000
 On Rorty / Richard Rumana, 2000
 Philosophy and freedom: Derrida, Rorty, Habermas, Foucault / John McCumber, 2000
 A pragmatist's progress?: Richard Rorty and American intellectual history / John Pettegrew, 2000
 Problems of the modern self: Reflections on Rorty, Taylor, Nietzsche, and Foucault / Dudrick, David Francis, 2000
 The last conceptual revolution: a critique of Richard Rorty's political philosophy / Eric Gander, 1999
 Richard Rorty's politics:  liberalism at the end of the American century / Markar Melkonian, 1999
 The work of friendship: Rorty, his critics, and the project of solidarity / Dianne Rothleder, 1999
 For the love of perfection: Richard Rorty and liberal education / René Vincente Arcilla, 1995
 Rorty & pragmatism: the philosopher responds to his critics / Herman J Saatkamp, 1995
 Richard Rorty: prophet and poet of the new pragmatism / David L Hall, 1994
 Reading Rorty: critical responses to Philosophy and the mirror of nature (and beyond) / Alan R Malachowski, 1990
 Rorty's humanistic pragmatism: philosophy democratized / Konstantin Kolenda, 1990

External links
 
 
 
 UCIspace @ the Libraries digital collection: Richard Rorty born digital files, 1988–2003
 Internet Encyclopedia of Philosophy entry
 Stanford Encyclopedia of Philosophy entry
 Rorty audio, "Dewey and Posner on Pragmatism and Moral Progress," University of Chicago Law School, April 14, 2006.
 PhilWeb's entry for Richard Rorty An exhaustive compilation of on-line links and off-line sources.
 Rorty essays published in Dissent (magazine)
 Rorty audio, informative interview by Prof. Robert P. Harrison, Nov. 22, 2005.
 Rorty interview, "Against Bosses, Against Oligarchies," conducted by Derek Nystrom & Kent Puckett, Prickly Paradigm Press, Sept. 1998.
 Rorty interview, The Atlantic Monthly, April 23, 1998.
 Rorty Memorial Lecture by Jürgen Habermas, Stanford University, Nov. 2, 2007.
 Rorty eulogized by Richard Posner, Brian Eno, Mark Edmundson, Jürgen Habermas, Daniel Dennett, Stanley Fish, David Bromwich, Simon Blackburn, Morris Dickstein & others, Slate Magazine, June 18, 2007.
 "The Inspiring Power of the Shy Thinker: Richard Rorty" by Hans Ulrich Gumbrecht, Telos, June 13, 2007.
 Richard Rorty at Princeton: Personal Recollections by Raymond Geuss in Arion, Winter 2008
 Rereading Rorty by Albrecht Wellmer in Krisis, 2008.

1931 births
2007 deaths
20th-century American non-fiction writers
20th-century American philosophers
21st-century American non-fiction writers
21st-century American philosophers
21st-century American writers
American atheists
American people of German descent
American people of Irish descent
American social democrats
Critical theorists
Deaths from pancreatic cancer
Epistemologists
Heidegger scholars
Hermeneutists
Humor researchers
Irony theorists
MacArthur Fellows
Metaphilosophers
Metaphysicians
Ontologists
Philosophers of culture
Philosophers of education
Philosophers of history
Philosophers of language
Philosophers of literature
Philosophers of mind
Philosophers of science
Pragmatists
Princeton University faculty
University of Chicago alumni
Wellesley College faculty
Wittgensteinian philosophers
Members of the American Philosophical Society
Deaths from cancer in California